The Point is a 67-story skyscraper in Panama City, Panama. It is 266 meters high.

The high-end luxurious building enjoys what many have called the best location in the city of Panama. 
Due to its prime location and height, The Point is visible from almost any point in the city.

At the time of its completion, The Point was the tallest building in all of Latin America.

See also 
 List of tallest buildings in Panama City 
 Star Bay Tower

References 
https://www.emporis.com/buildings/270306/the-point-panama-city-panama

Residential buildings completed in 2011
Residential skyscrapers in Panama City